The Yoni Expedition was British campaign launched in 1887 against the Yoni Chiefdom of the Temne people of Sierra Leone.

Composition of expedition
The expedition was led by Francis de Winton and consisted of:
 1st West India Regiment: 298 troops
 Sierra Leone Police Corps: 45 men
 HMS Acorn, HMS Icarus and HMS Rifleman: 38 naval personnel
 irregulars from friendly tribes: 400 men  The British were supported by a force led by Sory Kessebeh from Bumpe, who had previously experienced attacks from the Temne.
 local porters to transport supplies: 500 men
 local bush-cutters to open up a track through the bush: 200 
 government officials and military officers: 19 men
The seamen manned a 7-pounder rifled, muzzle-loading field gun and a Maxim machine gun. The West Indians were each armed with a Martini-Henry rifle and they also operated tubes firing rockets.

References

Military of Sierra Leone
British West Indies
Infantry regiments of the British Army
British colonial regiments
Military history of Jamaica